Jajjay Sahian is a village in Sialkot District, Pakistan. 

Villages in Sialkot District